Major-General Joseph Robert Davis (January 12, 1825September 15, 1896) was an American politician and lawyer who served as the commanding general of the Mississippi National Guard from 1888 to 1895. During the American Civil War, he served as aide-de-camp to the President of the Confederate States and commanded a brigade in the Army of Northern Virginia. He is best known for his role at Gettysburg. A member of the Democratic Party, he represented Madison and Scott counties in the Mississippi Senate from 1860 to 1861.

Early life and education 
Joseph Robert Davis was born on January 12, 1825, in Louisiana, to Isaac and Susan ( Hartley) Davis, who were of Welsh and Irish origin, respectively. He attended Miami University. Davis engaged in private law practice in Madison County, Mississippi until 1860, when he was elected to the state senate.

American Civil War 

Entering the Confederate service as Captain of Militia from Madison County, Davis had no formal military training. He was soon made Lieutenant-Colonel of the 10th Mississippi Infantry, after which he served on the personal staff of his uncle, President Jefferson Davis, in Richmond, Virginia, as an aide-de-camp with the rank of Colonel of Cavalry. Commissioned a brigadier-general for the provisional army of the Confederate States to rank from September 15, 1862, and confirmed by the Confederate States Senate only after charges of nepotism were freely aired and his nomination once rejected, he was assigned a brigade in Heth's Division, 3d (Hill's) Corps, Army of Northern Virginia, which he led through some of the most bitter battles of the war. He fought at Gettysburg (where his brigade suffered heavily in the railroad cut on the first day of the battle and participated in Pickett's Charge on the third day), in the Wilderness Campaign, and at the Siege of Petersburg.

Later life 
Paroled at Appomattox Court-House on April 9, 1865, Davis returned to Mississippi. After the war he resided in Harrison County, his home most of the time being at Biloxi. He died on September 15, 1896, and is buried at Biloxi Cemetery.

Personal life 
Davis was married in 1848 to Frances H. D. Peyton, and secondly, in 1870, to Margaret C. Green. He had two daughters.

Dates of rank

See also  
 List of Confederate States Army generals
 List of members of the United Confederate Veterans
 List of Miami University people

Notes

References

Further reading

External links 

 
 Joseph R. Davis at The Political Graveyard
 

1825 births
1896 deaths
19th-century American lawyers
19th-century American politicians
American Civil War prisoners of war
American lawyers admitted to the practice of law by reading law
American militia officers
American people of Irish descent
American people of Welsh descent
American planters
American slave owners
Burials in Mississippi
Businesspeople from Mississippi
Confederate States Army brigadier generals
Farmers from Mississippi
Major generals
Miami University alumni
Mississippi lawyers
Mississippi National Guard personnel
Democratic Party Mississippi state senators
People from Biloxi, Mississippi
People from Louisiana
People from Madison County, Mississippi
People of Mississippi in the American Civil War